The Sărata is a  long left tributary of the river Prut in southern Moldova. It flows through the villages Sărata-Galbenă, Sărăteni, Cazangic, Sărata Nouă and Filipeni, and it discharges into the Prut near the village Nicolaevca.

References

Rivers of Moldova
Tributaries of the Prut